Gonococcemia (also known as "Disseminated gonococcal infection") is a rare complication of mucosal Neisseria gonorrhoeae infection, or Gonorrhea, that occurs when the bacteria invade the bloodstream. It is characterized by fever, tender hemorrhagic pustules on the extremities or the trunk, migratory polyarthritis, and tenosynovitis. It also rarely leads to endocarditis and meningitis. This condition occurs in 0.5-3% of individuals with gonorrhea, and it usually presents 2–3 weeks after acquiring the infection. Risk factors include female sex, sexual promiscuity, and infection with resistant strains of Neisseria gonorrhoeae. This condition is treated with cephalosporin and fluoroquinolone antibiotics.

Epidemiology 

Neisseria gonorrhoeae is a gram negative diplococcus (also referred to as "Gonococcus") and a pathogenic bacteria. In 2019, there were 616,392 reported cases of gonorrhea in the United States, with an overall increased rate 5.7% from 2018 to 2019. Among those approximately 600,000 cases, it is estimated that 0.5-3% of gonorrheal infections result in gonococcemia. This condition is more common in women, affecting approximately 2.3-3% of women with gonorrhea and 0.4-0.7% of men. This discrepancy is explained by increased incidence of silent gonorrheal infections in females and an increased rate of transmission to females that have sexual intercourse with infected males. Gonococcemia also occurs more frequently in pregnant women, those with recent menstruation, and those with IUDs.

Risk Factors 

 Infection with certain strains of Neisseria gonorrhoeae
 Prolonged infection
 Female sex (due to asymptomatic infection, and therefore prolonged infection)
 Sexual promiscuity
 Immune system deficiencies
 Infection during menstruation, pregnancy, or in the puerperium period

Symptoms 

 Fever
 Migratory arthralgias
 Hemorrhagic pustules
 Tenosynovitis
 Rarely headache, neck stiffness, and visual changes (associated with meningitis)

Treatment 

Treatment typically consists of cephalosporin and fluoroquinolone antibiotics. Gonococcemia is typically treated with intravenous or intramuscular cephalosporin antibiotics. Approximately 10-30% of gonorrheal infections present with a co-infection of chlamydia, so it is common to add a one-time dose of oral azithromycin or doxycycline for coverage of Chlamydia trachomatis. Bacterial resistance to antibiotics is increasingly common in Neisseria gonorrhoeae, so it is often advised to check susceptibility of the bacterial culture and then adjust the antibiotic therapy as needed.

Pathogenesis 

Neisseria gonorrhoeae is transmitted during sexual contact with an infected individual. The bacteria invade the non-ciliated columnar epithelium of the urogenital tract, oral mucosa, or anal mucosa following exposure. Invasion of the host cells is made possible due to virulence factors such as Pili, LOS, Opa, and others. Similarly, these virulence factors can be used for avoiding the host immune system, which may explain prolonged infection, bacterial resistance, and gonococcemia.

See also 
 Primary gonococcal dermatitis
 List of cutaneous conditions

References 

Bacterium-related cutaneous conditions
Medical triads